Byung is a Latin-alphabet spelling of a common syllable in Korean given names. The meaning differs based on the hanja used. There are 17 hanja with this reading on the South Korean government's official list of hanja which may be used in given names; the most common ones are listed in the table at right. Names which begin with this syllable include:

Byung-chul
Byung-hee
Byung-ho
Byung-hoon
Byung-hun
Byung-joon
Byung-woo
Byung-wook

References

Korean given names